The 2015 IAAF World Championships, the fifteenth edition of the IAAF World Championships, were held from 22 to 30 August at the National Stadium in Beijing, China. Forty-three nations won medals, 144 of which were awarded. Kenya topped the medal table for the first time, with 7 gold, 6 silver and 3 bronze medals. The United States won 18 medals, six gold, six silver and six bronze, which was the highest tally. Host nation China, finished 11th on the medals table, while Russia finished ninth.

205 IAAF member countries and territories participated, two more than in 2013, with new IAAF member, Kosovo, making its debut. South Sudan was also set to participate for the first time, but its sole athlete did not show up in Beijing.

Eritrea won their first world title at these championships, with Ghirmay Ghebreslassie winning the men's marathon.

The event was the largest sporting event to take place at the Beijing National Stadium ("Bird's Nest") since the 2008 Summer Olympics.

Bidding process
When the seeking deadline passed on 15 March 2010, three candidate cities (Beijing, London and Chorzów) had confirmed their candidatures. London then withdrew citing that they didn't want to seem to be biased towards the bids for the Olympic Stadium by committing themselves to an athletics event, as the host for this event was to be announced before their 2011 stadium bid deadline. London then stated that they would bid for 2017 and had the blessing of the IAAF to do so. The IAAF announced Beijing as the winning candidate at the IAAF Council Meeting in Monaco on 20 November 2010.
The Council of IAAF approved the dates of 22 August until 30 August 2015.

Venue

The event was primarily held at the Beijing National Stadium, which served as the athletics venue during the 2008 Summer Olympics. Weather concerns prompted a reduction in capacity for the World Championships in Athletics; only the lower and middle tiers of the stadium were open, capping the venue at around 54,000 spectators rather than its capacity of 80,000. Tickets for the championships were available in three price categories, ranging from 50 RMB to 500 RMB.

Qualifying standards

Event schedule

All dates are CST (UTC+8)

Event summary

Men

Track

Field

Women

Track

Field

Exhibition events

Medal table

Participating nations
Two hundred and seven countries (or, more accurately, IAAF members) with a total of 1,933 athletes were entered. Of those 1,771 athletes from 205 countries actually competed (thus excluding reserve athletes and non-starters). The biggest delegation was the one from the US with 130 athletes. Two countries, Ghana and South Sudan, were set to participate, but none of their athletes showed up. The number of athletes per nation is shown in parentheses.

Anti-doping
As part of the event, the IAAF conducted a wide-reaching anti-doping programme. This included information-led targeted tests in the months previous to the championships and testing of athletes in and outside of competition during the championships. In total, the IAAF undertook 1,405 instances of athlete doping controls in Beijing. This included 662 blood tests to inform the longitudinal athlete biological passport programme, 161 blood tests specifically directed at identifying usage of either human growth hormone and/or erythropoiesis-stimulating agents (EPO), 54 out-of-competition urine tests and 528 urine tests conducted on-site (which also incorporates 239 for EPO analysis).

As was the case since the 2005 World Championships, athletes' doping samples were stored for future analysis, which could allow retrospective disqualifications via subsequent improvements to testing technology and methods. The number of tests was a new high for the event and the largest ever conducted by a sport-specific governing body at an event. The testing was undertaken in partnership with the Chinese National Anti-Doping Agency (CHINADA). An anti-doping education programme was also conducted, which included presentations on the risks of doping and a questionnaire designed by the World Anti-Doping Agency.

Initial analysis identified two failed tests, both Kenyan women: hurdler Koki Manunga and sprinter Joy Nakhumicha Sakari. Both were disqualified immediately from the competition.

See also
2015 IPC Athletics World Championships

References

External links

 (archived)

 
World Athletics Championships
World Championships in Athletics
World Championships in Athletics, 2015
International athletics competitions hosted by China
Sports competitions in Beijing
2010s in Beijing
August 2015 sports events in China
Athletics in Beijing